Shahrina Ramphaul (born 15 January 1978) is a part-time actress, philanthropist, advocator for women's rights, trichologist and entrepreneur.

Early life 
Shahrina was born in Chatsworth, a small suburb in the south-east of Durban in South Africa predominantly inhabited by South Africans of Indian origin. She was born to a Muslim mother and a Hindu father and grew up in a wealthy family spread over Erica Avenue in Chatsworth. She completed her Matric from Kharwastan Secondary School in 1996 and then completed her diploma in Cosmetology and Trichology from Cato Manor Technical College in 1998. She moved to Johannesburg same year for better career opportunities

She studied Bharata Natyam at Sastri College (Durban) and at Anisha Singh Dance Academy for 6 years (1990 - 1995). She studied modelling for 7 years and graduated from Ashika D’ Modeling Agency (Durban) in 1997. In 1996 Shahrina was awarded with a dance scholarship to travel with “Bombay Beats” to the United Kingdom, Canada and the United States. She performed with international stars Anu Malik, Adnan Sami, Alka Yagnik and Debasis Das Gupta. She was also crowned the First Princess Miss India South Africa in 1997.

Career

Broken Promises - The Series 
Shahrina got her first big break in 2008 when she was selected by Kumaran Naidu for his TV series Broken Promises - The Series produced for M-Net's pay channel Africa Magic Plus. Shahrina portrayed the character of Krystal Naicker, a fashion consultant trying to win back her ex-boyfriend Deena through fair and unfair means. The series as well as Shahrina's character gained a cult following among the South African Indian community with her trademark "nose twitch" winning her many fans. The later part of the series was however mired with contractual disputes as some actors including Shahrina were not paid on time. This led her to quit the series and her character was phased out by the 19th episode of the series.

Spill the Beans and other films 
In 2009, Shahrina started working on an interactive talk show to be hosted by her and produced by Preshanthan Moodley's Hello Boy Productions. She produced and co-scripted 2 successful seasons of Spill the Beans over Coffee and all the episodes were aired on Africa Magic. In 2010 she went on to star in Kumaran Naidu's movie The House Knows where she played the role of a feisty and demanding journalist.

Zara 

In 2013, Shahrina wrote and produced her first independent feature film with Preshanthan Moodley as the director. The short film Zara is based on a true story of a woman who was a victim of domestic violence from her husband, who himself was having an extra-marital affair. The movie was shot over a weekend with Shahrina herself starring as the main protagonist Zara and Rahul Brijnath playing the role of her husband Ajay. The film was produced on a shoestring budget with much of the shooting taking place in Shahrina's home in Durban. Zara was released on DVD in the stores of AA Video in July 2014 to widespread critical acclaim and the DVD sales are growing steadily.

Future productions 
With the success of Zara, Shahrina has started devoting time to meaningful cinema that carry a strong message for the society. She is currently busy writing a number of scripts all of which have a strong undertone of women empowerment. These productions are based on true stories with an aim to deliver strong and positive messages. The productions planned include a sequel to Zara, No…means NO! which tackles rape in South Africa and Delicate Rose (working title), which takes us on a path of different women facing adversities and how they overcome their struggles. She is currently busy planning a pilot for a third season of Spill the Beans over Coffee.

Personal life

Family and work 
Shahrina is the eldest of three children with a younger brother and a sister. Her father runs his own transportation business, in which her brother is involved.

Since 1998, Shahrina has been working in different South African corporates while pursuing her interest in show business. In 2004 she completed her Higher Diploma in Business Administration and Management from Damelin, she is currently completing her Postgrad in Business Management through University of Essex (London) and has subsequently registered for her Masters in Business Administration. In 2007 she started the franchise of Dream Nails in Greenside but sold it off after operating it for two years. She was part of the organizing team of the 2010 FIFA World Cup, an experience she always cherishes.  She is currently working as a Manager in a mining company in Johannesburg. Among her many planned ventures is a hygiene company called Green Glove which she is busy building.

Social work and philanthropy 
A staunch feminist, Shahrina advocates woman empowerment, for the rights of the abandoned elderly and orphaned kids. She uses her twitter handle regularly to voice her opinion on the prevailing social and political issues in the world. She chairs numerous women forums and associations in South Africa. The feminism has and continues to inspire much of her work and she aims to do her bit in eradicating the evils of society through her productions.

Shahrina is also involved in a number of charities and other social work. She supports Nazareth House Johannesburg, a charity home that takes care of abandoned adults and children who cannot take care of themselves. She has also initiated various drives to gather funding of other various forms of charities.

Filmography

Film

Television

See also 
 Zara (2014 film)
 Preshanthan Moodley

References 

1978 births
South African actresses
Living people